Bridgeboro is an unincorporated community located within Delran Township in Burlington County, New Jersey, United States. It is situated on the Rancocas Creek. Bridgeboro is located near U.S. Route 130, which crosses the Rancocas, connecting Delran with Delanco Township.

Transportation
NJ Transit provides service to and from Philadelphia on the 409 route.

Notable people

People who were born in, residents of, or otherwise closely associated with Bridgeboro include:
 Ernest F. Schuck (1929-2009), politician who served for seven years as mayor of Barrington, New Jersey and eight years in the New Jersey General Assembly, from 1974 to 1982, where he represented the 5th Legislative District.

References

Delran Township, New Jersey
Unincorporated communities in Burlington County, New Jersey
Unincorporated communities in New Jersey